Reading Borough Council is the local authority for the Borough of Reading in the English county of Berkshire. It is a unitary authority, having the powers of a non-metropolitan county and district council combined. Berkshire is purely a ceremonial county, with no administrative responsibilities.

Governance

Reading Borough Council has adopted the committee system of governance, and the current leader of the council is Jason Brock of the Labour Party. The largely ceremonial post of mayor is held by Rachel Eden.

Wards 
Reading's councillors are elected by 16 wards:

 Abbey
 Battle
 Caversham
 Caversham Heights
 Church
 Coley
 Emmer Green
 Katesgrove
 Kentwood
 Norcot
 Park
 Redlands
 Southcote
 Thames
 Tilehurst
 Whitley

Each ward is represented by 3 councillors, following a boundary review completed in time for the 2022 local elections.  Prior to 2022, the previous boundaries were adopted in 2004, making the 2022 elections the first in eighteen years to elect the entire council.

Premises
Since 2014 the council has been based at the Civic Offices on Bridge Street.

Reading's historic Town Hall on Blagrave Street was built in phases between 1786 and 1897, and served as the headquarters of the borough council until 1976. The council then moved to a new Civic Centre off Castle Street, adjoining other facilities including a police station, magistrates' court, and The Hexagon theatre.

By 2013 the council's offices at the civic centre were deemed to be at the end of their design life. The council purchased an existing building called Plaza West on Bridge Street, which had been built in 1986 (originally being called Bridge Street Plaza). The building was renamed Civic Offices and opened as the council's headquarters in 2014, with the old council offices at the civic centre being demolished shortly afterwards.

See also
Reading Borough Council election results
List of mayors of Reading

References

External links 
 Reading Borough Council official web site
 Reading Borough Council list of Councillors
 Local Election Results - 5 May 2022

1974 establishments in England
Leader and cabinet executives
Unitary authority councils of England
Politics of Reading, Berkshire
Local education authorities in England
Local authorities in Berkshire
Billing authorities in England